Kitija Laksa (born 21 May 1996) is a Latvian professional basketball player for TTT Riga and the Latvian national team.

Laksa played for the American collegiate team South Florida Bulls. She suffered a knee injury in November 2018 and missed the rest of her senior season. Instead of returning for a fifth year, Laksa signed with Latvian professional team TTT Riga in July 2019.

Laksa was drafted in the first round, 11th overall, by the Seattle Storm in the 2020 WNBA Draft. She signed a contract with the storm on April 25, 2020, but she was waived by the team on May 13, 2021.

South Florida statistics
Source

References

External links

USF Bulls bio
EuroBasket 2017 profile

1996 births
Living people
Latvian expatriate basketball people in the United States
Latvian women's basketball players
Seattle Storm draft picks
Small forwards
South Florida Bulls women's basketball players
Basketball players from Riga